The Hayling Seaside Railway, formerly East Hayling Light Railway, is a  narrow gauge railway on Hayling Island, Hampshire, England. It is mainly a diesel operated railway, though from time to time the railway hires steam locomotives from other narrow gauge railways. It operates passenger trains between Beachlands and Eastoke Corner.

History
The Hayling Seaside Railway began life as the East Hayling Light Railway (EHLR), formed by Bob Haddock, a member of the society who in the mid-1980s attempted to reinstate the "Hayling Billy" Line.  Havant Borough Council had already decided to turn the disused railway line into a cycle-way and footpath which precluded any chance of rebuilding the line as standard gauge, the option preferred by the committee of the society. Some members including Haddock decided to create their own railway elsewhere on Hayling Island and after numerous setbacks, a site was found within the Mill Rythe Holiday Camp where the EHLR was constructed and ran successfully for many years. Havant Council took the step of including a railway in their draft plan for Hayling's popular Pleasure Beach. Haddock submitted a plan for a narrow gauge railway to meet the Council's criteria, but the council refused planning permission. After a campaign lasting over 12 years, permission to build the railway was granted, but only after the Council's decision was overturned by the Department of the Environment.

Following closure of the EHLR at Mill Rythe, work started in October 2001 on the building of Beachlands Station on land leased from the neighbouring Funland Amusement Park. Work continued through 2002 and into 2003 and the line finally opened to passengers on 5 July 2003, re-christened as "The Hayling Seaside Railway".  there was a mile of track in place and it was planned to extend it to the ferry terminal connecting the island with Portsmouth so providing a useful transport link. However, in 2015 the Portsmouth to Hayling ferry was withdrawn from operation due to the owners becoming bankrupt so this extension looks doubtful.

In the early part of 2015 after a lengthy period of campaigning to the local authority work started on a new depot at Eastoke Corner as the lease on the depot at Beachlands had run out.  , the railway runs out of the new Eastoke Corner depot.

In September 2019 the owners (Mr & Mrs Haddock) put the business up for sale by lease or outright purchase, in regard to their wishes to retire and travel.

Stock list

Locomotives

Coaches

1 L Class coach named Lisa
3 M Class coaches named Mavis, Michelle & Marilyn

Wagons

2 tippers
3 open sided 3-5 plank wagons
1 tanker
1 brakevan

See also

 British narrow gauge railways
 Hayling Island branch line

References

External links 

Hayling Seaside Railway official site including full details with route map and photographs

Heritage railways in Hampshire
2 ft gauge railways in England
Railway lines opened in 2003
Hayling Island